In enzymology, a peroxisome-assembly ATPase is an enzyme that catalyzes the chemical reaction

ATP + H2O  ADP + phosphate

Thus, the two substrates of this enzyme are ATP and H2O, whereas its two products are ADP and phosphate. Its function is to transport components of the peroxisome in and out of the organelle.

This enzyme belongs to the family of hydrolases, specifically those acting on acid anhydrides to facilitate cellular and subcellular movement.  The systematic name of this enzyme class is ATP phosphohydrolase (peroxisome-assembling). This enzyme is also called peroxisome assembly factor-2.

References

 
 
 

EC 3.6.4
Enzymes of unknown structure